Sally Anne Capp is an Australian politician who is the 104th lord mayor of Melbourne, elected on 18 May 2018 and sworn in on 24 May 2018. She is also the former executive director of the development lobbying group the Property Council of Victoria.

Capp was educated at Presbyterian Ladies' College before graduating with honours in economics and law from the University of Melbourne. Her first career was a solicitor.

Previously Capp was chief of operations of the Victorian Employers Chamber of Commerce and the former Victorian agent-general in London from 2009 to 2012, the first woman to hold the office.

Capp is the former CEO of the Committee for Melbourne and was a director of Collingwood Football Club to 2009, the first woman to serve on the board of that club.

On 18 May 2018, Capp was declared elected as lord mayor of Melbourne in the 2018 by-election for lord mayor, following the resignation of Robert Doyle on 4 February. She was sworn in on 24 May.

Capp was re-elected as lord mayor in November 2020, securing another four-year term.

In 2022, Capp supported calls to change the date of Australia Day.

On 25 November 2022, Capp was slammed for saying that COVID-19 was "good" for the City of Melbourne.

Electoral history

References

Living people
Year of birth missing (living people)
People educated at the Presbyterian Ladies' College, Melbourne
University of Melbourne alumni
Melbourne Law School alumni
University of Melbourne women
Mayors and Lord Mayors of Melbourne
Agents-General for Victoria
Women mayors of places in Victoria (Australia)
Collingwood Football Club administrators
Victoria (Australia) local councillors